Celeste Jaguaribe de Matos Faria (5 April 1873 – 9 Sept 1938) was a Brazilian composer, poet, singer and teacher who used the pseudonym Stella Bomilcar. She was born in Rio de Janeiro, daughter of João Paulo Gomes de Mattos and Joana de Alencar Jaguaribe Gomes de Mattos. She first studied piano in Fortaleza and later at the Colegio Imaculada Conceicao. She became a professor of music and died in Rio de Janeiro.

Works
Selected works include:
A morte da boneca (Text: Celeste Jaguaribe de Matos Faria)
A noite
A pedra (Text: Celeste Jaguaribe de Matos Faria)
Aquele amor (Text: Celeste Jaguaribe de Matos Faria)
Berceuse (Text: Celeste Jaguaribe de Matos Faria)
Canção da velhinha
Covardia
Cromo (Text: Celeste Jaguaribe de Matos Faria)
Interrogação (Text: Celeste Jaguaribe de Matos Faria)
Minha vida é assim
Num postal
O jasmineiro (Text: Celeste Jaguaribe de Matos Faria)
O menino curioso
O ponte (Text: Celeste Jaguaribe de Matos Faria)
Olhos azuis (Text: Celeste Jaguaribe de Matos Faria)
Penas de garça (Text:Auta de Souza)
Rosas (Text: Celeste Jaguaribe de Matos Faria)
Saudade
Tão só
Treva, penumbra e luz
Trovas (Text: Celeste Jaguaribe de Matos Faria)
Vida fugaz

References

1873 births
1938 deaths
20th-century classical composers
Brazilian music educators
Women classical composers
Brazilian classical composers
Women music educators
20th-century women composers